Fernando Galhardo Borges (born 31 August 1985, in Cianorte), better known as Fernandinho, is a Brazilian footballer who currently plays as a left-back for Botafogo–SP.

Club career
On 18 April 2012, Fernandinho signed a loan with Palmeiras.

Honours
Palmeiras
Copa do Brasil: 2012
Campeonato Brasileiro Série B: 2013

See also
 List of Sociedade Esportiva Palmeiras players

References

External links
 

1985 births
Living people
Brazilian footballers
CR Vasco da Gama players
Avaí FC players
Sociedade Esportiva Palmeiras players
Campeonato Brasileiro Série A players
Campeonato Brasileiro Série B players
Association football defenders